The Citadel Bulldogs baseball teams represented The Citadel, The Military College of South Carolina in Charleston, South Carolina, United States in the sport of college baseball in the NCAA Division I Southern Conference.  The program was established in 1899, and has continuously fielded a team since 1947.  Their primary rivals are College of Charleston, Furman and VMI.

2000

Roster

Coaches

Schedule

2001

Roster

Coaches

Schedule

Rankings

2002

Roster

Coaches

Schedule

2003

Roster

Coaches

Schedule

2004

Roster

Coaches

Schedule

2005

Roster

Coaches

Schedule

2006

Roster

Coaches

Schedule

2007

Roster

Coaches

Schedule

2008

Roster

Coaches

Schedule

2009

Roster

Coaches

Schedule

MLB Draft picks

References

The Citadel Bulldogs baseball seasons